A glycine receptor antagonist is a drug which acts as an antagonist of the glycine receptor.

Examples

Antagonists
 Selective
 Brucine
 Strychnine
 Tutin
 Non-selective
 Bicuculline
 Caffeine
 Picrotoxin
 Pitrazepin
 Thiocolchicoside

See also
 Glycine receptor agonist

References

External links

 
Drugs acting on the nervous system